Akbar Mohammadi is a retired Iranian football player and lastly, he managed the Iran national under-19 team. He holds a Ph.D. of Sport Management from Tarbiat Modares University.

References 
http://www.the-afc.com/u-19-championship-2012/all-the-opponents-are-tough-argi
http://www.teammelli.com/2012/11/03/akbar-miohammadi-concentration-the-key/
http://www.com-cup.com/index.php/en/matches/11-kubok-sodruzhestva-2012/matchi-2012/151-match-en35
http://www.aseanfootball.org/v2/2012/09/aff-u19-iran-in-final-match/
http://www.footballpakistan.com/2011/11/iran-ease-past-pakistan-5-0-in-afc-u19-qfrs/
https://www.svenskafans.com/varlden/U-19-landslaget-imponerar-i-Ryssland-432178.aspx
https://www.tuttomercatoweb.com/nazionali/?action=read&idnet=dHV0dG9uYXppb25hbGkuY29tLTc2NzE
https://vff.org.vn/U21-quoc-te-2006/giai-bong-da-U21-quoc-te-bao-thanh-nien-2011-U21-iran-thang-U21-singapore-30-16784.html
http://www.the-afc.com/u-19-championship-2012/all-the-opponents-are-tough-argi

1975 births
Living people
Iranian footballers
Iranian football managers
Association footballers not categorized by position
Iranian radio and television presenters